The enzyme (1-hydroxycyclohexan-1-yl)acetyl-CoA lyase catalyzes the chemical reaction

(1-hydroxycyclohexan-1-yl)acetyl-CoA  acetyl-CoA + cyclohexanone

Hence, this enzyme has one substrate, (1-hydroxycyclohexan-1-yl)acetyl-CoA, and two products, acetyl-CoA and cyclohexanone.

This enzyme belongs to the family of lyases, specifically the oxo-acid-lyases, which cleave carbon-carbon bonds.  The systematic name of this enzyme class is (1-hydroxycyclohexan-1-yl)acetyl-CoA cyclohexanone-lyase (acetyl-CoA-forming). This enzyme is also called (1-hydroxycyclohexan-1-yl)acetyl-CoA cyclohexanone-lyase.

References 

 

EC 4.1.3
Enzymes of unknown structure